The evening is the period of the day between afternoon and night.

Evening may also refer to:

 Evening (magazine), a Japanese magazine
 Evening (novel), a 1998 novel by Susan Minot
 Evening (film), a 2007 film
 Evenings (film), a 1989 Dutch film
 Evening (EP), EP by Mae
 Symphony No. 8 (Haydn) by Haydn, nicknamed "Evening"